Forgemasters was a British electronic music act composed of Robert Gordon, Winston Hazel and Sean Maher. Their single "Track with No Name" was the first release by Warp Records and would help define the sound of Warp and bleep techno.

History
Robert Gordon, Sean Maher and Winston Hazel were colleagues in the FON record shop and studio in Sheffield. Gordon was an engineer at FON Studio and co-founder of Warp Records. The name Forgemasters was taken from a local heavy engineering firm, Sheffield Forgemasters.

Their single "Track with No Name" was the first release by Warp Records. It was of a techno subgenre, the primarily Sheffield based bleep techno, and written in four hours one evening at Gordon's home studio. Dave Simpson, writing in Fact in 2012, described it as "driven by an eerie pulse, a sound which would soon be called a ‘bleep’ and become the distinctive signature of hardcore northern techno and, for its first two years, the sound of Warp." Matt Anniss, writing for Resident Advisor in 2014, called it "one of the defining records of the era".

Discography

Singles and EPs
 "Track with No Name" (Warp, 1989) – released in association with Outer Rhythm
 The Black Steel E.P. (Network, 1991)
 Quabala EP (Hubba Hubba, 1992)

Singles with contributions by Forgemasters
 "Network Retro #8: Back 2 Back Classics" (Network, 1993) – "Somebody New" by MK* / "Track with No Name (Communique Mix)" by Forgemasters

Compilation album appearances
 Warp 10: Influences, Classics, Remixes – Warp 10+2: Classics 89–92 (Warp, 1999) – includes "Track with No Name"
 Rob Gordon Projects by Rob Gordon (Source, 1996) – includes "Clap Your Hands", "" [sic] and "Presence"

Remixes
 "Man Machine (Cyber - Subsonik) mix", Man Machine (Outer Rhythm, 1989) – "Man Machine (Cyber - Subsonik)" and "Man Machine (Elektro - Genetik)" mixed by Forgemasters
 "15 Inches+" (Rebuilt by Forgemasters) – The Wad (Earth, 1997). Included on 7 Hills Clash – Rebuilt EP
 "Commercial Rain (Rub-A-Dub Mix)" – Inspiral Carpets (Mute, 1990). Included on "Commercial Rain"/"She Comes in the Fall (Remixes)"

See also
 Nightmares on Wax
 Sweet Exorcist
 Tricky Disco

References

External links
 

English electronic music groups
English techno music groups
Musical groups from Sheffield
British musical trios
Warp (record label) artists
Rhythm King artists